Maria Theresia von Ahlefeldt (16 January 1755 – 20 December 1810) was a German born aristocrat and a Danish composer. She is known as the first female composer in Denmark.

Biography
Born in Regensburg, Maria Theresia was the eldest child and daughter of Alexander Ferdinand, 3rd Prince of Thurn and Taxis (1704–1773) and his wife, Princess Maria Henriette Josepha of Fürstenberg-Stühlingen (1732–1772). She was a younger half-sister of Karl Anselm, 4th Prince of Thurn and Taxis and niece of Maria Augusta of Thurn and Taxis.

She grew in a cultural environment at the princely court in Regensburg, which was a centre of French, German and Italian opera, theatre, ballet, pantomimes and concerts. She was instructed in clavecin playing with her sisters and displayed an early talent of music composition.

Maria Theresia was engaged to Prince Joseph of Fürstenberg (1758-1796) from 1772 until her affair with an elderly German Prince Philipp of Hohenlohe-Ingelfingen (1702-1781) in 1776. Her family, however, refused permission for her to marry Philip. In 1780 in Prague, she married the Danish noble Count Ferdinand of Ahlefeldt-Langeland (1747–1815), against the will of her family. Having conducted a marriage against the will of her family was a criminal act, for which she was forced to flee to avoid arrest.

From 1780, Maria Theresia's spouse was Marshal at the Court of Ansbach, where she was active in the amateur theatre of Elizabeth Craven. During this time, she wrote a libretto. From 1792 to 1794, her spouse was marshal of the Danish royal court and director of the Royal Danish Theatre. Maria Theresia composed music for several ballets, operas, and plays of the royal theatre.  She was given good critic as a composer and described as a “virkelig Tonekunstnerinde” ('a True Artist of Music').

She moved to Dresden with her spouse in 1798, and lived from 1800 until her death in Prague.

Selection of work
 La Folie, ou quel Conte! (libretto) 1780s
 Telemak paa Calypsos Øe (music, aria, choir), 1792
 Veddemaalet (music), 1793
 Romance de Nina 1794/98

Ancestry

References

External links
 

1755 births
1810 deaths
18th-century Danish composers
18th-century German composers
18th-century women composers
19th-century Danish composers
19th-century German composers
19th-century women composers
German Classical-period composers
Danish classical composers
Danish women composers
Women classical composers
Maria Theresia Ahlefeldt
People from Regensburg
Maria Theresia Ahlefeldt